Tordher (Urdu: تورڈھیر, old name Pul/Depo) is a village in Tehsil Takht Bhai, Mardan District of the Khyber Pakhtunkhwa province Pakistan, located 7 km west of Takht Bhai. Its population is nearly 35,000 and consists mainly of Mohmand tribes (Daweze, Malagori, Mandakhel, Safi, Khanjaryan and other small tribes).

References

Mardan  Union councils

Populated places in Mardan District